Matias Riikonen (born 24 February 2002) is a Finnish footballer who plays as a goalkeeper for Inter Turku.

Club career
On 22 September 2020, Riikonen joined the U19 side of Danish Superliga club F.C. Copenhagen on a season-long loan deal.

On 26 November 2021, he signed a two-year contract with Inter Turku.

Career statistics

Club

Notes

References

2002 births
Living people
Finnish footballers
Finnish expatriate footballers
Finland youth international footballers
Association football goalkeepers
Myllykosken Pallo −47 players
FC Ilves players
F.C. Copenhagen players
FC Inter Turku players
Kakkonen players
Veikkausliiga players
Finnish expatriate sportspeople in Denmark
Expatriate men's footballers in Denmark